Carol Ann Crawford (February 22, 1934 – August 10, 1982), also known as  Carol Stolkin and Carol Ross, was an American backgammon and bridge player from Buffalo, New York who spent many years in Detroit, Michigan. In 1973, she became the second woman to win the World Backgammon Championship.

She was the second wife of John R. Crawford. Like her husband, she had talent in both backgammon and bridge.

Bridge accomplishments

Wins
National Mixed Pair

Runners-up

 North American Bridge Championships (3)
 Chicago Mixed Board-a-Match (2) 1974, 1975 
 Smith Life Master Women's Pairs (1) 1976

References

External links

American backgammon players
American contract bridge players
1982 deaths
1934 births
Sportspeople from New York City
People from Wilmette, Illinois